in Venice. He was active towards the close of the 17th century, and born in Milan.

References

Italian engravers
17th-century Italian artists
Year of death unknown
Year of birth unknown